Sky Force is a vertically scrolling shoot 'em up video game series created by the Polish video game developer Infinite Dreams Inc. The gameplay is reminiscent of Capcom's 19XX series and Seibu Kaihatsu's Raiden series, featuring a weapon upgrade system and large end of stage bosses.

Sky Force 
The first title in the series was originally released for Symbian and Pocket PC in 2004 and was ported to Palm webOS (2005), iOS (2009) and Android (2010). The first game in the series was an entirely sprite-based 2D game.

Reception 
The game received a near perfect rating by IGN who gave it a score of 9.5 out of 10.

Sky Force Reloaded 
The second outing was initially released for Symbian, Pocket PC and Palm webOS in 2006 and was later released for iOS (2009), Android (2010) and PSP (2011). The PSP version of "Sky Force Reloaded" was simply named "Sky Force". The 2D graphics style of the first title was combined with some 3D polygon objects like destructible towers. It received a remake for mobile (Android) in 2016, with a PC, PlayStation 4, and Xbox One versions released in 2017, and also a Nintendo Switch version released in 2018. A version for Tesla cars was released in 2021.

Reception 
The PSP version of the game received a Metacritic score of 69 out of 100, based on 6 reviews.

Sky Force 2014 
The third part in the series was released in 2014 for both iOS and Android as a Free-to-play game. In the third part of the series, the 2D graphics of the first two titles were entirely replaced with polygonal 3D graphics.

Reception 
The iOS version of the game received a favorable Metacritic score of 83 out of 100,  based on 8 reviews.

Sky Force Anniversary 
This title is the Windows version of Sky Force 2014 and was released on Steam in 2015 and the Apple TV 4 in 2016. It was released for PlayStation 3, PlayStation 4 and PlayStation Vita via PlayStation Network in summer 2016. This version is not F2P and has an improved upgrade system. It's also available for the Wii U on the Nintendo eShop.

Reception 
The game received a favorable review by Hardcore Gamer who gave it a score of 4 out of 5.

References

External links 
 Publisher's website of Sky Force 2014

Vertically scrolling shooters
IOS games
Pocket PC software
Video games developed in Poland
WebOS games
Windows games
Android (operating system) games
Video game franchises